Ljiljani (English translation: Lilies) is the tenth studio album of Bosnian singer Halid Bešlić. It was released in 1991.

Track listing

References

1991 albums
Halid Bešlić albums